The Cowbridge Physic Garden is located in Cowbridge, Vale of Glamorgan in South Wales. The  physic garden was created by the Welsh Historic Gardens Trust in 2004, and was opened in June 2008 by Camilla, Duchess of Cornwall. who is its patron. Surrounded by high stone walls, parts of which date to the 13th century, the physic garden is situated within a former 18th century formal garden which belonged to the Edmondes family of Old Hall. The garden was designed to replicate the styles of its 18th century predecessor, and only plants found in Britain before 1800 are included in the garden.

References

External links

 Official website

Cowbridge
Herb gardens
2008 establishments in Wales
Gardens in Wales